was a Japanese mathematician in the Edo period.

Sakabe served for a time in the Fire Department of the shogunate, but he resigned that position to become a rōnin or masterless samurai.  He spent the rest of this life in study, in teaching, and in promoting mathematics education in Japan.

Sakabe was a student of Ajima Naonobu.

Sakabe investigated some European and Chinese works which had appeared in Japan, but his general method was later construed to be innovative, clarified and thus improved. Foreign influence shows itself indirectly some of his published work.

Sakabe's Sampo Tenzan Shinan-roku (Treatise on Tenzan Algebra) in 1810 was the first published work in Japan proposing the use of logarithmic tables. He explained that "these tables save much labor, [but] they are but little known for the reason that they have never been printed in our country."  Sakabe's proposal would not be realized until twenty years after his death when the first extensive logarithmic table was published in 1844 by Koide Shuke.

In Sakabe's Treatise on Tenzan Algebra, mathematical problems are arranged in order from easy problems to difficult ones. The text presents a method for finding the length of a circumference and the length an arc of an ellipse. This was the first appearance of the problems pertaining to ellipses in printed books in Japan.

Selected works
In a statistical overview derived from writings by and about Harry Smith Parkes, OCLC/WorldCat encompasses roughly 10+ works in 10+ publications in 1 language and 10+ library holdings.

 1795 — Shinsen Tetsujutsu
 1802 — Kaiujutsu-keima (Considerations on the theory of the polygon)
 1803 — Rippō-eijiku, method for finding cube root
 1810 —   OCLC 22057236896, Treatise on Tenzan Algebra
 1812 — Kwanki-kodo-shōhō, measurement of spherical arcs and trigonometrical tables
 1816 —   OCLC 122810576, theory of navigation applying the spherical astronomy of the West

See also
 Sangaku, the custom of presenting mathematical problems, carved in wood tablets, to the public in shinto shrines
 Soroban, a Japanese abacus
 Japanese mathematics

Notes

References 
 Endō Toshisada (1896). . Tōkyō: _.  OCLC 122770600
 David Eugene Smith and Yoshio Mikami. (1914).   A History of Japanese Mathematics. Chicago: Open Court Publishing.   OCLC 1515528 – note alternate online, full-text copy at archive.org
 Wiskundig Genootschap (Mathematical Society). (1907)  Nieuw archief voor wiskunde (New Archive of Mathematics''). Amsterdam, Swets & Zeitlinger.   OCLC 5814818

Japanese writers of the Edo period
18th-century Japanese mathematicians
19th-century Japanese mathematicians
1759 births
1824 deaths